Nana Osei Bandoh is an American professional wrestler and manager of Ghanaian extraction, better known by his ring name, Prince Nana. He has stated that he is an Ashanti prince.

Early life 
Although Nana was born in the United States, he claims that he is the son of an Ashanti tribe member with royal heritage and the heir to the throne of Ashanti in Ghana. When Nana was three, his family relocated to Ghana for five years, returning so that Nana could be educated in America. As a teenager, he relocated to New York City in America as an exchange student. In 1992, at the age of fifteen, Nana watched WrestleMania VIII, and was inspired by the WWF Championship match between "Macho Man" Randy Savage and Ric Flair to become a wrestler. A year later, he wrote to the World Wrestling Federation and asked their advice as to which professional wrestling school he should attend. The WWF recommended that he train under Larry Sharpe in New Jersey, but Nana felt that Sharpe's school was too far away. Instead, Nana became a photographer for Johnny Rodz, who operated Gleason's Gym in New York. Nana worked for Rodz until he turned eighteen, when Rodz began training him as a wrestler.

Professional wrestling career
Nana debuted in 1996, wrestling in a church in Spanish Harlem.

Nana worked regularly for the East Coast Wrestling Association in Delaware and USA Pro Wrestling in New York, as well as making appearances with the WWF and with Pro Wrestling ZERO1-MAX in Japan.

Ring of Honor (2002–present)
In 2002, he joined the upstart Ring of Honor promotion, where in 2004 he formed a heel stable known as The Embassy. In storylines, Nana used his wealth gained from the taxes of people of Ghana to hire wrestlers to wrestle his opponents and rivals. Under his management R. J. Brewer defended his ROH Pure Championship and Jimmy Rave, Alex Shelley and Abyss won the Trios Tournament in 2006. He remained with Ring of Honor until September 2006, when he gave his notice.

On October 24, 2008, in Danbury, Connecticut, Nana made a surprise return to Ring of Honor, saying he has no more riches, no more crown, and just wants a job before he was dragged away by security. The next night, Nana made an appearance at Ring of Honor's Edison, New Jersey show and did the same thing. Again, he was dragged away by security.  The next time ROH was in Edison on January 17, 2009, Nana again appeared, only to be dragged away by security.  He has since been featured in segments on the ROH Video Wire.  In a March edition of the ROH Video Wire, Nana revealed that he had regained his riches due to President Obama's stimulus package, and has been directing Bison Smith's attacks on ROH wrestlers.
On March 20, at the ROH show in Elizabeth, Pennsylvania, Nana declared that he had officially reformed the Embassy, with himself, Bison Smith and Ernie Osiris. The next day in New York City they were joined by the returning Jimmy Rave. Other members of the stable came to include Claudio Castagnoli, Joey Ryan, Erick Stevens, Shawn Daivari and Necro Butcher, but by October 2010 all of them, except Osiris, had left the group. On January 22, 2011, Nana debuted the latest version of the Embassy, consisting of Ernesto Osiris, Mia Yim, R.D. Evans, and Tommaso Ciampa, who would take over Jimmy Rave's former role as Nana's number one wrestler. The following April and June, both Dave Taylor and Rhino made appearances representing the Embassy. On the July 28 episode of Ring of Honor Wrestling, The Embassy disbanded, when Ciampa turned on Nana, after R.D. Evans had revealed his deal with Truth Martini, which had cost Ciampa the ROH World Television Championship.

On Monday, June 3, 2013, Nana received a tryout with WWE. Nana commented on the tryout on Facebook, writing, "Great day with the WWE...The future may be bright....Fools."

In mid-2013, Nana was given the new on-screen role of ROH Talent Scout. In late 2014, Nana formed yet another version of the Embassy with Moose, Stokely Hathaway and Veda Scott, which was later disbanded.

Nana was the manager of Donovan Dijak, after he sent him some envelopes every time he wrestled, until he finally departed from The House of Truth that took place on February 25, 2016 episode of ROH tapings.

On July 23, 2022, at Death Before Dishonor, Prince Nana returned and announced he had purchased Tully Blanchard Enterprises and reformed The Embassy, with Brian Cage, Kaun and Toa Liona. The trio would go on to defeat the team of Alex Zayne, Blake Christian and Tony Deppen during the preshow. At Final Battle, Cage, Liona and Kaun, defeated Dalton Castle and The Boys, to win the ROH World Six-Man Tag Team Championships, under Nana's guidance. This victory marked the first time in his 20-year history with the company that Prince Nana had managed his Embassy clientele to ROH gold.

Championships and accomplishments
CyberSpace Wrestling Federation
CSWF Tag Team Championship (1 time) – with Sonjay Dutt
East Coast Wrestling Association
ECWA Heavyweight Championship (1 time)
ECWA Mid Atlantic Championship (2 times)
New York Wrestling Connection
NYWC Tag Team Championship (1 time) – with MEGA
Pro Wrestling Illustrated
PWI ranked him #311 of the top 500 singles wrestlers in the PWI 500 in 2010
USA Pro Wrestling
USA Pro New York State Championship (2 times)

References

External links

 Ring of Honor profile
 
 

1977 births
21st-century African-American sportspeople
20th-century African-American sportspeople
African-American male professional wrestlers
American photographers
American people of Ashanti descent
American people of Ghanaian descent
American male professional wrestlers
John Dewey High School alumni
Living people
People from New York City
Professional wrestling managers and valets